El Hamadia District is a district of Bordj Bou Arréridj Province, Algeria.

Municipalities
The district is further divided into 4 municipalities:
El Hamadia
El Ach 
Ksour
Rabta

Districts of Bordj Bou Arréridj Province